Sir Jeffrey Mark Donaldson (born 7 December 1962) is a Northern Irish politician who has served as leader of the Democratic Unionist Party (DUP) since June 2021. He has been the Member of Parliament (MP) for Lagan Valley since 1997, and leader of the DUP in the UK House of Commons since 2019. As of 2022, he is Northern Ireland's longest-serving MP.

Donaldson was a member of the Orange Order and served in the Ulster Defence Regiment during the Troubles. He was also the campaign manager for the UUP MP Enoch Powell's successful re-election campaigns in 1983 and 1986. He was the Ulster Unionist Party (UUP) candidate for Lagan Valley at the 1997 general election, and was elected as an MP to the House of Commons. He simultaneously represented the same constituency as a Member of the Legislative Assembly (MLA) in the Northern Ireland Assembly from 2003 to 2010. Donaldson is known for his opposition to UUP leader David Trimble's support of the Good Friday Agreement during the Northern Ireland peace process, especially from 1998 to 2003. In 2003, Donaldson resigned from the UUP, becoming a member of the DUP in the following year.

Donaldson served in the Northern Ireland Executive from 2008 to 2009 as a Junior Minister for First Minister Peter Robinson. After Nigel Dodds lost his seat at the 2019 general election, Donaldson became the DUP Westminster leader. He was a candidate in the May 2021 Democratic Unionist Party leadership election, losing to Edwin Poots. After Poots resigned the following month, Donaldson was elected unopposed to succeed Poots in the June DUP leadership election; he was confirmed in the post by the party's ruling executive on 30 June. He was once again elected to the Northern Ireland Assembly in the 2022 Northern Ireland Assembly election, but he subsequently chose to remain as a Westminster MP and not take up his seat.

Early life
Donaldson was born in Kilkeel, County Down, in Northern Ireland, where he was the oldest of five boys and three girls.  He attended Kilkeel High School, where he excelled at debating, then Castlereagh College.  At the age of sixteen he joined the Orange Order, and then the Ulster Unionist Party's Young Unionists.

Two of Donaldson's cousins were killed by the Provisional Irish Republican Army while serving in the Royal Ulster Constabulary: Sam Donaldson was killed in 1970 and Alex Donaldson, a Chief Inspector, died in a mortar attack on a Newry police station in 1985.

Donaldson served with the Kilkeel company of the 3rd Battalion Ulster Defence Regiment (3 UDR), where he was later promoted to corporal.

Donaldson worked as an insurance broker in the 1980s.

Political career
From 1982 to 1984 he was the constituency agent for the Ulster Unionist MP Enoch Powell, managing Powell's successful re-election campaigns in 1983 and 1986.  He then worked as personal assistant to the UUP leader James Molyneaux until Molyneaux retired from politics in 1997.

Entering politics
In October 1985, at the age of 22, following the death of Raymond McCullough, Donaldson was elected with a large majority in a by-election to the Northern Ireland Assembly to represent South Down. In April 1986 Donaldson partook in a unionist demonstration attempting to blockade a conference of the Ulster Teachers' Union held in Newcastle, County Down, in protest at the Anglo-Irish Agreement. Demonstrators blocked teachers' cars and scuffled with the police; at one point protestors broke through police lines and attacked Education Minister Brian Mawhinney's car with flag poles. After further violence arrests were made. Donaldson told reporters afterward "What we're saying to Brian Mawhinney here today is that he may think that he is an Ulsterman but the people of Ulster... want no part of a man who has betrayed the people of Ulster." Mawhinney labelled the protestors "thugs". In June that year after Secretary of State for Northern Ireland Tom King ordered the dissolution the Assembly, Donaldson was one of twenty-one unionist representatives who refused to leave the chamber at Stormont and was eventually physically removed from the building by the Royal Ulster Constabulary (RUC).

In 1996 he was first-placed candidate on the UUP list for the Northern Ireland Forum elections, virtually guaranteeing him a seat. Donaldson, by this time serving as Assistant Grand Master of the Orange Order, was a prominent figure in the ongoing Drumcree conflict over a yearly loyalist parade in the town of Portadown. He justified unionist demonstrators cutting off Belfast International Airport by saying "in a democracy people have the right to protest and unfortunately some people get inconvenienced". This led to his selection in 1997 as a candidate for the Westminster Parliament; he was elected at the 1997 general election as the Member of Parliament (MP) for the Lagan Valley constituency, succeeding James Molyneaux. At that time he was tipped as a potential future leader of the Ulster Unionist Party.

Donaldson stated in Richard English's book, Armed Struggle, that because of a "deep sense of injustice that I felt had been perpetrated against my people and specifically against my family", he joined both the Ulster Defence Regiment and the Ulster Unionist Party at the age of 18 to oppose the IRA both militarily and politically.

Role in the peace process
In 1998, Donaldson was in the Ulster Unionist Party's negotiating team for the Good Friday Agreement. However, on the morning of the day the agreement was concluded on 10 April 1998, Donaldson walked out of the delegation.  He rejected some of the arrangements, notably the lack of a link between Sinn Féin's admittance to government and IRA decommissioning.

Dissent with the UUP
Disagreements over the Good Friday Agreement negotiations planted the seeds of discontent between the figurehead of the anti-agreement faction of the UUP (Donaldson) and the pro-agreement party leader (Trimble). Donaldson was not allowed to stand in the 1998 assembly election as a party rule stopped MPs, apart from the leader and deputy leader, from going forward as assembly candidates.

Donaldson engineered several party council meetings in protest against David Trimble's policies. The council, however, backed Trimble's leadership, and on 23 June 2003, along with fellow MPs David Burnside and Martin Smyth, Donaldson resigned the Ulster Unionist whip at Westminster. The MPs remained party members and in November 2003 Assembly election Donaldson was elected to the Northern Ireland Assembly for the UUP as an MLA for Lagan Valley.

Following the success of the rival Democratic Unionist Party (DUP) in the same Assembly election of 2003, he reiterated his call for Trimble's immediate resignation, but the party continued to back Trimble. On 18 December 2003 Donaldson, Norah Beare MLA and Arlene Foster announced their resignation from the UUP, and on 5 January 2004 they announced that they had joined the DUP.

After joining the DUP 
Donaldson was returned to the House of Commons of the United Kingdom in the 2005 UK general election and in 2007 was appointed to the Privy Council of the United Kingdom, entitling him to the honorific style of The Right Honourable. At the March 2007 Northern Ireland Assembly election, he was re-elected as an MLA for Lagan Valley.

In July 2009, The Daily Telegraph reported that Donaldson had repaid £555 claimed for pay-to-view films in overnight hotel stays. In total, Donaldson submitted claim forms, including receipts, for 68 pay-to-view movies. The newspaper claimed "hotel sources confirmed that films he put on his expenses during 2004 and 2005 were in the highest price category offered to guests, covering the latest blockbusters and adult movies" although no evidence is offered that he did and Donaldson issued an official statement denying watching any content of an adult or pornographic nature.

Donaldson was appointed to government by First Minister Peter Robinson, and held the position of Junior Minister in the Office of the First Minister and deputy First Minister from 2008 to 2009. Being also an MP, he lost his position due to the DUP's phasing out of "double jobbing". Following his re-election to the House of Commons at the general election in May 2010, Donaldson stood down from the Northern Ireland Assembly on 10 June, and was replaced on 16 June by Paul Givan.

He was a member of the Public Bill Committee for the Defence Reform Act 2014.

DUP leadership 
On 3 May 2021, exactly 100 years from when Northern Ireland was effectively established, Donaldson declared his candidacy for the leadership of the DUP to replace Arlene Foster. On 14 May, he was defeated by Edwin Poots MLA, by 19 votes to 17.

On 17 June, Poots resigned after only 21 days in post. Poots had faced an internal revolt against his decision to proceed without delay to nominate Paul Givan as First Minister after Sinn Féin had reached an agreement with the Westminster government about an Irish Language Act. The Belfast Telegraph described the events as "one of the most tumultuous days in the DUP's 50-year history".

On 21 June, Donaldson declared his candidacy for the leadership of the DUP to replace Edwin Poots, pledging to make the Northern Ireland Protocol his main priority. He was the sole candidate. The party's electoral college, which met on 26 June, endorsed him as leader-designate and he was confirmed in the post by the party's ruling executive on 30 June.

In July 2021 Donaldson said in a UTV interview that he intended to resign his seat as a Westminster MP and become Northern Ireland First Minister before the 2022 Northern Ireland Assembly election, but also said that he did not yet know precisely how he would bring this about.

On 23 August 2021, Prime Minister Boris Johnson appointed Donaldson as the UK's trade envoy to Cameroon, in addition to his role as the trade envoy to Egypt.

It was announced on 24 August 2021, that Donaldson was planning to stand as a candidate for Lagan Valley in the Assembly election the following year, if he is unable to get co-opted to a vacant seat in the time leading up to the election. Plans were drawn up to temporarily re-allow "double jobbing", which would have allowed Donaldson to be in the Assembly and remain an MP. However, these plans were dropped, so, if Donaldson becomes a member of the Assembly, he will cease to be an MP, triggering a by-election. Donaldson was elected to the Assembly in the May 2022 election, but declined to take up his seat, with the party instead co-opting Emma Little-Pengelly. Donaldson said he would not take up his Assembly seat until the situation over the Northern Ireland Protocol is resolved.

Views
Donaldson opposed the Good Friday Agreement (GFA). He supported Brexit, but called for the Northern Ireland Protocol agreement between the UK and the EU in December 2020, which establishes a customs and regulatory border in the Irish Sea separating Northern Ireland from Great Britain, to be reformed or revoked. Despite his earlier rejection of the GFA, he stated in January 2021 that the Protocol "actually undermines the Good Friday agreement".

Donaldson has been accused of making anti-Catholic comments. In 2009, Social Democratic and Labour Party (SDLP) deputy leader Alasdair McDonnell demanded an apology from Donaldson and a retraction of his claim that Catholics owed allegiance in the first instance to the Pope and the Holy See.

In March 2019, Donaldson was one of 21 MPs who voted against LGBT inclusive sex and relationship education in English schools. He opposes same-sex marriage in Northern Ireland, legalised by the British Government in December 2019. Jeffrey Donaldson has repaid £555 to the House of Commons’ fees office after charging dozens of pay-to-view movies to the tax payer.The former junior minister made claims for 68 pay-to-view movies at London hotels where he stayed in 2004 and 2005, according to the Daily Telegraph.

Honours
Donaldson was sworn in as a member of the Privy Council of the United Kingdom in 2007. This allows him the Honorific Style "The Right Honourable" for life.

He was appointed Knight Bachelor in the 2016 Birthday Honours for political service, although the merit was disputed by Sinn Fein.

Personal life
On 26 June 1987, Donaldson married Eleanor Mary Elizabeth Cousins, with whom he has two daughters.

He is a member of the mainstream Presbyterian Church in Ireland.

Speaking of his national identity, Donaldson says that he is “Irish and British, Northern Irish and British, and British.” He notes that he is a member of the Irish Presbyterian church, which is organised on an all-Ireland basis. He supports Ulster and Ireland in rugby, Lisnagarvey hockey club (which plays for Ireland), Ireland in cricket, and Northern Ireland in football. He describes his national identity as geographically Irish, but also as being "part of a wider group of nations that is British". He believes that there is no contradiction in identifying as Irish, Northern Irish and British.

References

External links
 
 Maiden Speech: House of Commons – 20 May 1997
Appearances on C-SPAN (As UUP member)
Appearances on C-SPAN (As DUP member)

1962 births
Living people
Democratic Unionist Party MLAs
Democratic Unionist Party MPs
Members of the Northern Ireland Forum
Members of the Parliament of the United Kingdom for Lagan Valley
Northern Ireland MLAs 2003–2007
Northern Ireland MLAs 2007–2011
Northern Ireland MPAs 1982–1986
Junior ministers of the Northern Ireland Assembly (since 1999)
People educated at Kilkeel High School
People from Kilkeel
People of The Troubles (Northern Ireland)
Presbyterians from Northern Ireland
Ulster Defence Regiment soldiers
Ulster Unionist Party members of the House of Commons of the United Kingdom
Knights Bachelor
Members of the Privy Council of the United Kingdom
Politicians awarded knighthoods
UK MPs 1997–2001
UK MPs 2001–2005
UK MPs 2005–2010
UK MPs 2010–2015
UK MPs 2015–2017
UK MPs 2017–2019
UK MPs 2019–present
Ulster Unionist Party MLAs
Northern Ireland MLAs 2022–2027
Leaders of political parties in Northern Ireland